Paromalini is a tribe of clown beetles in the family Histeridae. There are at least 270 described species in Paromalini.

Genera
 Athomalus Mazur, 1993
 Australomalus Mazur, 1981
 Carcinops Marseul, 1855
 Coomanister Kryzhanovskij, 1972
 Cryptomalus Mazur, 1993
 Diplostix Bickhardt, 1921
 Eulomalus Cooman, 1937
 Eutriptus Wollaston, 1862
 Globodiplostix Vienna and Yélamos, 2006
 Indodiplostix Vienna, 2007
 Pachylomalus Schmidt, 1897
 Paromalus Erichson, 1834
 Platylomalus Cooman, 1948
 Xestipyge Marseul, 1862

References

 Mazur, Slawomir (1997). "A world catalogue of the Histeridae (Coleoptera: Histeroidea)". Genus, International Journal of Invertebrate Taxonomy (Supplement), 373.

Further reading

 Arnett, R. H. Jr., M. C. Thomas, P. E. Skelley and J. H. Frank. (eds.). (21 June 2002). American Beetles, Volume II: Polyphaga: Scarabaeoidea through Curculionoidea. CRC Press LLC, Boca Raton, Florida .
 
 Richard E. White. (1983). Peterson Field Guides: Beetles. Houghton Mifflin Company.

External links

 NCBI Taxonomy Browser, Paromalini

Histeridae
Beetle tribes